Lesley Thomson  (born 1958) is a British novelist and creative writing tutor at West Dean College.

Biography
She grew up in London and was educated at Holland Park Comprehensive School and the universities of Brighton and Sussex. She published her first novel Seven Miles to Sydney in 1987 with Pandora Press. She lives in Lewes with her partner.

A Kind of Vanishing, a crime novel about a child who goes missing at the abandoned Tide Mills Village in Sussex, UK, in 1968, was published by Myriad Editions in 2007. It was republished with an afterword by the author and an endorsement from Ian Rankin in 2011 after winning the 2010 People's Book Prize for Fiction in 2010. Her book The Detective's Daughter won the eBook of the Year award on Sainsbury's eBooks as it was the most recommended book of 2013. Her next novel, Ghost Girl, was published in April 2014.

References

External links 
 
 A Kind of Vanishing page, Myriad Editions
 "Winners for 2009/2010", The People's Book Prize
 Lesley Thomson, "Has being an only child influenced my being a writer?" Only Child Experience and Research, 18 April 2011,

1958 births
21st-century English novelists
Living people
Alumni of the University of Brighton
Alumni of the University of Sussex
People educated at Holland Park School